Nancy Linehan Charles (born November 11, 1942) is an American character actress of film, television and theater. Charles was born in New York City. On screen since the 1990s, she has appeared in more than 70 films and television programs as well as stage productions.

Her son is actor Will Rothhaar.

Filmography

Film

Television

External links 
 
Official Website

1942 births
Living people
Actresses from New York City
21st-century American women

References